Nicholas Valentino Lampson (born February 14, 1945) is an American politician and restaurateur who is a former Democratic Congressman representing the 22nd Congressional District and the 9th Congressional District of Texas.

Early life, education, and early political career
Lampson is a lifelong resident of Southeast Texas and a second-generation Italian-American. His grandparents came to the United States from Italy one hundred years ago and settled in Stafford, where they had farms and were founding members of their church. His parents grew up, met, and married in Fort Bend County. Lampson's mother and father eventually moved to Beaumont, where he was born.

Lampson is one of six children born to a welder and a homemaker. His father died when he was 12 years old, and Lampson took his first job at that young age sweeping floors to supplement the family's income. Lampson's mother received $19 per month from Social Security as long as he stayed in school. This money helped his family stay together in those difficult years. This would later influence his commitment to protecting Social Security.

Though Lampson's mother had only a fifth grade education, she encouraged her children in school, and all six graduated from college with at least one degree. His mother earned her GED on her 80th birthday. Lampson earned a Bachelor of Science degree in biology and a master's degree in education from Lamar University, where he was a member of the Pi Kappa Alpha fraternity. He taught high school science at Hebert High School in Beaumont. An inner calling to be of service to others, and the experience of interning with Congressman Jack Brooks in 1969, led him to seek public office.

In 1976, Lampson was elected tax assessor-collector for Jefferson County and served nearly twenty years. He instituted an emphasis on customer service, successfully pushed for major upgrades in computer technology, and reduced the cost of collecting taxes by $3 million a year. He resigned from his post in order to run for congress.

First period in Congress (1997–2005)

Elections
1996
In the 1996 election, Lampson decided to run for a seat in the U.S. House of Representatives representing Texas's 9th congressional district. The incumbent was Republican U.S. Congressman Steve Stockman, who was a freshman in congress. The district had been represented by Democrat Jack Brooks for 42 years, but Brooks had been one of the most prominent Democratic incumbents to lose re-election in the "Republican Revolution" of 1994, which brought the House under the control of Republicans for the first time since the 83rd United States Congress following the 1952 elections. Lampson won the Democratic primary with 69% of the vote. In the general election, he defeated Stockman 53%-47%.

1998

He won re-election to a second term against Republican Tom Cottar 64%-36%.

2000
He won re-election to a third term against Republican Paul Williams 59%-40%.

2002
He won re-election to a fourth term against Republican Paul Williams 59%-40%.

2004

Lampson was one of the prime targets of a controversial mid-decade redistricting in 2003. His district was renumbered as the 2nd district. Galveston, which along with Beaumont had anchored the district and its previous incarnations for over a century, was moved into the neighboring 14th District. Much of Galveston County and the portion of Houston including NASA's Johnson Space Center (which had been part of the 9th since 1967) were drawn into DeLay's 22nd District. They were replaced by several heavily Republican areas north and east of Houston.

In the 2004 election, Lampson opted to run for reelection in the 2nd District. His Republican opponent was Ted Poe, a longtime district court judge in Harris County, home to most of Houston. Poe defeated Lampson, 56%-43%. Though Beaumont and Jefferson County gave Lampson a majority, he was swamped in the Harris County portion of the district, which supported Poe with 70% of the vote. He was one of several Democratic incumbents that were successfully removed from office as a direct result of Tom Delay's controversial mid-decade redistricting plan.

Second period in Congress (2007–2009)

Elections
2006

On May 4, 2005, Lampson announced his candidacy in Texas's 22nd congressional district, which had been held by DeLay for 20 years. In the 2003 redistricting, DeLay drew much of Lampson's former territory into his own 22nd district, including part of Galveston County (but not Galveston city) and the Johnson Space Center. Lampson had briefly considered a so-called "kamikaze" run against DeLay. He moved to Stafford, a city halfway between Houston and Sugar Land, where his grandparents immigrated to from Italy.

Conservative media pundits criticized Lampson's decision to run in the 22nd. Fred Barnes of Fox News Channel called him "a carpetbagger" who "moved into" DeLay's district. However, Lampson had represented all of the 22nd's portion of Galveston County, as well as part of its share of Houston, during his first stint in Congress. Also, as mentioned above, he had family connections in the district.

The 22nd had long been considered a solidly Republican district, with a Cook Partisan Voting Index of R+15. A Democratic presidential candidate had not carried the district since the Texan Lyndon B. Johnson defeated Barry Goldwater in the 1964 election. Democrats had not held the congressional seat since after the 1978 election. The 2008 presidential candidate Ron Paul had held the seat as a Republican before DeLay took over in 1985. Historically, among districts in the Houston area, only the 7th District has been considered more Republican.

DeLay, who was then the House Majority Leader, was seen as vulnerable. He had only won re-election by 14 points in 2004 against a relatively unknown Democrat who spent virtually no money—an unusually close margin for a party leader. Many experts believed that as a result of DeLay's attempts to make the other Houston-area districts more Republican, his own district was more competitive than the one he'd represented for his first 10 terms in Congress. Most importantly, DeLay had been investigated for corruption and was indicted on conspiracy and money laundering charges. DeLay denied all allegations and a Texas judge dismissed the former charge in late 2006; still, this damaged DeLay's credibility in the campaign.

On April 4, 2006, DeLay withdrew his candidacy for the upcoming November midterm elections in the face of questions about his ethics; he cited troubling poll numbers as the reason. Lampson announced on August 17, 2006, that three major police associations had endorsed him: the National Association of Police Organizations, the International Union of Police Associations, and the Texas State Police Coalition.

Texas Governor Rick Perry announced on August 29, 2006, that a special election would take place for the balance of DeLay's 11th term, coinciding with the general election on November 7, 2006. This meant that voters voted once in the special election for a candidate to fill DeLay's seat during the lame-duck session of the 109th Congress, and voted a second time for a candidate to represent the district in the 109th Congress. Lampson ran only for the full term, facing Republican Houston City Councilwoman Shelley Sekula-Gibbs.

On September 22, 2006, The Hotline ranked Texas' 22nd Congressional District House race as third (up from a previous ranking of fifth) in a list of the top 30 House races in the country. Additionally, other traditionally conservative organizations backed Lampson's candidacy. The National Rifle Association and the Veterans of Foreign Wars both supported Lampson in the 2006 election.

Three national political journals—the Cook Political Report, Larry Sabato's Crystal Ball, and Congressional Quarterly—rated the race as Leans Democratic. On October 30, 2006, a Zogby poll commissioned by the Houston Chronicle-KHOU-TV was released, showing the write-in candidate, Sekula-Gibbs, at 27.9 percent and Lampson at 36 percent, with nearly 25 percent still undecided.

Lampson defeated Sekula-Gibbs in the November 7 election, 52 to 42 percent, with the remaining 6 percent going to Libertarian Bob Smither. He officially returned to Congress on January 4, 2007. But, DeLay was still on the ballot as the official Republican candidate (Democrats successfully sued to prevent Sekula-Gibbs' from replacing DeLay on the ballot, forcing her to run a write-in campaign). Meanwhile, Sekula-Gibbs ran unopposed in the special election. This caused confusion for many voters, who were told repeatedly "write in Sekula-Gibbs" but then found her name on the ballot. This resulted in a large (but unreleased) number of excluded votes for Tom DeLay in the general election. Numerous ballots were discarded, including all straight-party votes and direct votes for DeLay. This caused a small outcry of resentment from supporters of Sekula-Gibbs, who felt the election was stolen and their votes disfranchised.

The two elections held on the same day resulted in Sekula-Gibbs winning to serve the last two months of DeLay's term, while Lampson won the seat for a full term, starting in January 2007.

2008

Lampson faced reelection in 2008 against Pete Olson, an attorney and a former aide to Senators Phil Gramm and John Cornyn. Despite the perception that the district was more competitive than the one DeLay represented for his first 10 terms, the 22nd was considered a heavily Republican district. It gave Bush 64 percent of the vote in 2004. By most accounts, it was one of the few realistic chances for a Republican challenger to unseat a Democrat in what was forecast to be a bleak year for Republicans.

Olson and Lampson agreed to a debate on the issues on October 20, 2008, in Rosenberg, Texas.

An October 22, 2008, poll by John Zogby and the Houston Chronicle said that Olson had a 17-point lead over Lampson.

On October 30, 2008, Larry Sabato predicted Lampson's Congressional race to be a "Republican Pick Up" with Olson defeating Lampson.

On November 4, 2008, Olson defeated Lampson with 52.5% of the vote to Lampson's 45.3%. Lampson carried the Galveston County portion of the district, but could not overcome a 15,900-vote deficit in Harris County.

Later career

2012 Congressional election

After 14th District U.S. Congressman Ron Paul decided that he would not run for re-election to Congress in order to focus on his presidential campaign, Lampson filed papers to run for Congress in that 14th District. The 14th had been shifted well to the east in redistricting, and now included roughly 85 percent of the territory Lampson had represented during his first stint in Congress. Notably, Beaumont and Galveston, the largest cities in Lampson's old district, were now in the 14th. Lampson won the May 29, 2012 primary with 83.23% of the vote and faced State Rep. Randy Weber in the November 6th general election. Lampson was defeated by Weber on November 6, 2012 by a 53% to 45% margin. Lampson only carried his home county of Jefferson County and was unable to overcome the partisan lean of a district that was significantly redder than the territory he had previously represented.

2018 judicial election
Lampson ran for county judge of Jefferson County in 2018. His opponent was Republican incumbent Jeff R. Branick. The election was held on November 6, 2018. He lost the election, 50.63% to 49.37%, a margin of 949 votes. Governor Greg Abbott, Senator Ted Cruz, and Sean Hannity made public appearances in Jefferson County in order to rally support for the vulnerable incumbent, who had switched to the Republican Party a year earlier. Lampson was endorsed by the Beaumont Enterprise. He focused his campaign on securing relief for victims of Hurricane Harvey and diversifying the economic development of Jefferson County.

Other work
Lampson has worked on seniors' issues at the local and national levels as a director of the Area Agency on Aging. He served as a delegate to the 1995 White House Conference on Aging. He is active with local organizations such as the American Heart Association, Land Manor (a rehabilitation facility), and the Young Men's Business League. He is a member of the Pi Kappa Alpha fraternity. He was chair of the 1995 Bishop's Faith Appeal at the Diocese of Beaumont.

Awards and honors 
In 2019, Austria's Habsburg family honored Lampson with the "Medal of Friendship" in recognition of his work as a leading advocate for the NASA space program, the relationships he built with international partners, and his overall commitment to peace.

In 2012, Nick was honored as one of the "Legends of Galveston" at the Hilton Galveston Island Resort.

In 2008, Lampson was honored by the U.S. Chamber of Commerce with their prestigious "Spirit of Enterprise Award" in recognition of his pro-business voting record. During the same year he was the recipient of the National Federation of Independent Business (NFIB) Guardian of Small Business Award in recognition of his strong voting record and his efforts to increase business opportunities, reduce taxes, and eliminate overly burdensome taxes in the 110th Congress.

In 2004, the National Center for Missing and Exploited Children honored Lampson with the Congressional Leadership Award in recognition of his commitment to protecting American children. National television network Court TV honored Lampson with its first annual “Keep America Safe” award for his work on child safety issues.

In 2002, the Houston Chronicle ranked Lampson #1 in constituent services among all other Houston area congressmen.

He was recognized as the Outstanding Young Man of Beaumont in 1978 by the Texas Jaycees.

Personal life
Lampson is married to Susan Floyd-Lampson, a retired special education teacher and former Ms. Port Arthur. They have two daughters, Hillary and Stephanie, and six grandchildren. He and his family reside in their hometown of Beaumont. He currently serves as the Vice President of Operations at a regional healthcare company and administrator over their hospice program. He also owns restaurants in Port Arthur and Bridge City.

Lampson underwent a successful quadruple bypass surgery on March 25, 2007 at the Texas Heart Institute. He is a Roman Catholic.

Electoral history

* The 1996 election took place in two parts: an open special primary election on November 5, 1996, concurrent with the general election, followed by a runoff between the two highest vote-getters that took place on December 10, 1996 (as neither Lampson nor Stockman gained 50% of the vote).  This was because a three-judge court of the U.S. District Court for the Southern District of Texas redrew the boundaries of districts 18, 29, and 30, and redrew portions of districts 3, 5, 6, 7, 8, 9, 22, 24, 25, and 26.  The District Court further ordered that the candidates in these districts who have filed by August 30, 1996 and been certified by September 5, 1996 would compete in the open primary special election due to the lack of time for a normal primary. See Bush v. Vera.

*Write-in and minor candidate notes: In the 2006 special election for the remaining two months of DeLay's term, Republican Don Richardson received 7,405 votes and Republican Giannibicego Hoa Tran received 2,568 votes.  In the 2006 general election, Don Richardson received 428 votes and Joe Reasbeck received 89 votes.

References

External links 
 Official U.S. Congressional campaign site
 
 Profile at SourceWatch
 Biography and issue positions at Votimus.com
 

1945 births
Living people
Lamar University alumni
American people of Italian descent
People from Beaumont, Texas
Democratic Party members of the United States House of Representatives from Texas
21st-century American politicians
People from Stafford, Texas